Daria Adonina (born 13 November 2002) is a Russian Boccia player, who won bronze medal in the Mixed pairs BC4 event at the 2020 Summer Paralympics.

References 

2002 births
Living people
Medalists at the 2020 Summer Paralympics
Paralympic bronze medalists for the Russian Paralympic Committee athletes